V378 Normae, also known as HR 6120, is a star in the constellation Norma.  It is a likely Cepheid variable with a range of 6.21 to 6.23 and a period of 3.5850 days.

References

Norma (constellation)
Normae, V378
G-type supergiants
Durchmusterung objects
148218
080788
6120
Cepheid variables